Route 275 is a state highway in northeastern Connecticut running from Coventry to the Storrs section of Mansfield, and serving as a western feeder to the University of Connecticut.

Route description
Route 275 begins as Stone House Road at an intersection with Route 31 in the town center of Coventry. In Mansfield, the road becomes known as South Eagleville Road. After intersecting with Route 32 in Eagleville, Route 275 continues east-northeast another two miles (3 km) until it ends at an intersection with Route 195 at the southern side of the University of Connecticut campus in Storrs. Route 275 carries an average of 2,300 vehicles per day between Coventry and Eagleville, and 4,500 vehicles per day between Eagleville and Storrs.

History
Prior to 1963, the road connecting Eagleville to Storrs (South Eagleville Road) had been an unsigned state road (SR 575). The westward continuation into Coventry (Stonehouse Road) had been town-maintained and unnumbered. The state took over maintenance of Stonehouse Road (as an extension of SR 575) in 1962 as part of the Route Reclassification Act. Route 275 was designated at the beginning of 1963 from former SR 575. At an unconfirmed date after 1967, the section in the vicinity of the Coventry-Mansfield town line was realigned.

Junction list

References

External links

275
Transportation in Tolland County, Connecticut